The Sitnica is a  river in Kosovo. It flows into the Ibar at Mitrovica, and it is the longest river that flows completely within Kosovo.

History 
In the 14th century, during the reign of king Milutin, a canal connecting the Sazlija and the river Nerodimka was dug, creating an artificial bifurcation, since the Nerodimka flows to the south into the Lepenac river and thus belongs to the Aegean Sea drainage basin, while the Sitnica flows to the north, into the Ibar river and belongs to the Black Sea drainage basin. After World War II, the canal was covered with earth again.

The Sitnica was supposed to be the major part of the huge Ibar-Lepenac Hydrosystem, which was to regulate Ibar-Sitnica-Lepenac watercourse (including ecological protection, irrigation and power production), but the projected plan never came true.

Course 
The Sitnica originates from the Sazlija pond, north of the town of Ferizaj, and it is initially called the Sazlija river itself.

The Sitnica flows generally to the north, as the main river in the Kosovo Field, on the western slopes of the Žegovac mountain (from which it receives the right tributary of Žegovska river, south of Lipljan), next to the villages of Muhadžer Talinovac, Muhadžer Babuš, Robovce (where it receives the tributary of Shtime river from the left), Topličane, Gracko, Mali Alaš and the town of Lipljan. The river continues to the north between the villages Suvi Do, Skulanovo, Radevo and Batuse, as it enters the Kosovo coal basin (with the major mine, Dobri Do, right on the river), west of the provincial capital of Pristina. This is an area where the Sitnica receives some of its most important tributaries: the highly polluted Gračanka and Prištevka from the right, and the Drenica from the Drenica depression, from the left.

The river passes west of the Pristina suburbs of Kosovo Polje and Obilić and the village of Plemetina, between the mountain of Čičavica on the west, and the northernmost slopes of the Kopaonik mountain, on the east. The Sitnica leaves the coal basin as the most polluted river in the area, especially notorious for its highly toxic phenol spills, which pollutes not only the Sitnica, but also the downstream Ibar and West Morava rivers.

The Sitnica continues to the northwest, next to the villages of Prilužje, Mijalić, Reka (where it receives its major tributary, the Lab, from the right, Malo Kosovo field), Pestovo (where it receives another right tributary, the Slakovačka river), the town of Vushtrri, Senjak, Veliki Kičić and Malo Kičiće, emptying into the Ibar as its right tributary at Mitrovica, with an average discharge of 9,5 m³/s.

Many meanders have been cut through and dried out, so a curiosity is the long, nine-pillar Vojnovića bridge above the dry river bed, near Vushtrri.

Gallery

Notes and references

Notes

References

 Mala Prosvetina Enciklopedija, Third edition (1985); Prosveta; 
 Jovan Đ. Marković (1990): Enciklopedijski geografski leksikon Jugoslavije; Svjetlost-Sarajevo; 

Rivers of Kosovo
Geography of Ferizaj District